Dhemaji district (Pron:deɪˈmɑ:ʤi or di:ˈmɑ:ʤi) is an administrative district in the state of Assam in India. The district headquarters are located at Dhemaji and commercial headquarters being located Silapathar.  The district occupies an area of 3237 km² and has a population of 686,133 (as of 2011). Main religions are Hindus 548,780, Muslims 10,533, Christians 6,390.

Etymology
The district's name Dhemaji is derived from the Deori-Chutia word Dema-ji which means great water indicating it to be a flood-prone region.

History 
The areas of the present district was part of the greater Chutia kingdom along with Lakhimpur, Tinsukia, Jorhat, Dibrugarh and Sonitpur district from the 12th century to the 16th century until the Ahom-Chutia conflict during the early period of the 16th century. The Ahoms created a new position Banlungia Gohain to control the area. Monuments built during the Chutia rule include Malinithan, Garakhia Than, Bordoloni Than and Basudev temple. A number of monuments Ghuguha Dol, Ma Manipuri Than, Padumani Than built by the Ahom kings are worth visiting.

Dhemaji became a fully-fledged district on 14 October 1989 when it was split from Lakhimpur district.

Geography
It is one of the most developing districts of India, at the easternmost part of Assam. Situated in the foothills of the lower Himalayas it is relatively a small town.

Being in a confluence of rivers with the mighty Brahmaputra river flanking the district and its numerous tributaries running through the district, the region is perennially affected by floods.

The heart of Dhemaji district is Dhemaji Mouza (an area demarcated by the British regime for the purpose of tax collection, equivalent to a taluk or pargana in the pan-Indian context).

Secondly, Silapathar is the main business place of Dhemaji. The Bogibil project was running nearest to these place and is completed which connects Dibrugarh.

Education
The notable schools in the district include Borpataria L. P. School, Bhairabpur Netaji M. E. School, St.Francis de Sales school, Dhemaji public school, Sankar Dev High school (No. 2 Manik Pur), Mothers pride School, Silapathar Town Hanuman Gadhi Hindi High School, Dhemaji Boy's Higher Secondary School. Colleges include Dhemaji college,Dhemaji Engineering College, Dhemaji Commerce College,Moridhal College and many others. List of colleges in Dhemaji District are: 

Dhemaji College

Dhemaji Commerce College

 Dhemaji Girls College

Moridhal College

 Machkhowa Degree College

 Sisiborgaon College

 Pachim Dhemaji College

 Simen Chapori College

Gogamukh College

 Bordoloni Central College

 Dimow College

Silapathar College

Silapathar Science College

 Purbanchal College

 Murkongselek College

 Jonai Girls College

Jonai Science College

 Akajan College

Dhemaji Engineering College

 Dhemaji Polytechnic

Industrial Training Institute, Dhemaji

 DIET College Dhemaji

 Dhemaji PGT College (Private)

Economy
In 2006, the Indian government named Dhemaji as one of the country's 250 most backward districts (out of a total of 640). It is one of the eleven districts in Assam currently receiving funds from the Backward Regions Grant Fund Programme (BRGF). 

Silapathar is the most developed city in Dhemaji district. Its economy is mainly depended upon trade and commerce for development.

Divisions
There are two Assam Legislative Assembly constituencies in this district: Dhemaji and Jonai. Both are designated for scheduled tribes. They make up a part of the Lakhimpur Lok Sabha constituency. Dhemaji district is politically very poor. Community politics is main reason for this. As of 2019, Pradhan Baruah is MP (Member of Parliament), Ranuj Pegu is MLA from Dhemaji and Bhubon Pegu from Jonai.

Demographics
According to the 2011 census Dhemaji district has a population of 686,133, roughly equal to the nation of Equatorial Guinea or the US state of North Dakota. This gives it a ranking of 504th in India (out of a total of 640). Its population growth rate over the decade 2001-2011 was 20.3%. Dhemaji has a sex ratio of 949 females for every 1000 males, and a literacy rate of 69.07%. Scheduled Castes and Scheduled Tribes made up 6.45% and 47.45% of the population respectively.

Hindus are 95.47% of the population. There are small minorities of Muslims (1.96%) and Christians (1.27%).

According to the 2011 census, 39.21% of the district's population speaks Assamese, 32.53% Mising, 9.80% Bengali, 6.95% Boro, 5.26% Nepali and 1.49% Hindi as their first language.

Township areas
 Dhemaji
 Dimow
 Gogamukh
 Jonai Bazar
 Silapathar
 Simen Chapori
 Sissiborgaon
 Telam

Flora and fauna
It shares the park with Lakhimpur district.

References

External links
 Dhemaji district official website
 List of districts of Assam

 
Districts of Assam
1989 establishments in Assam